The Murder of Mary Russell is a 2016 mystery novel by American author Laurie R. King. Fourteenth in the Mary Russell series featuring married detectives Mary Russell and Sherlock Holmes, the novel focuses on the story of the couple's longtime housekeeper, Mrs. Hudson.

References

2016 American novels
Mary Russell (book series)
Sherlock Holmes pastiches
Bantam Books books